Tommy Ramos Nin (born April 29, 1986) is a retired Puerto Rican artistic gymnast and former member of the Puerto Rican national team known as the Golden Boys. He participated in the men's rings event at the 2012 Summer Olympics in London where he finished six among eight participants.

Personal life
Ramos married volleyball player Vilmarie Mojica on July 8, 2017, in a ceremony at Casa España in San Juan, Puerto Rico.  The couple have a daughter. Previously, he had dated fellow Olympic gymnast Catalina Ponor.

In popular culture

See also
 List of Pennsylvania State University Olympians

References

1986 births
Living people
Sportspeople from Bayamón, Puerto Rico
Puerto Rican male artistic gymnasts
Gymnasts at the 2012 Summer Olympics
Olympic gymnasts of Puerto Rico
Place of birth missing (living people)
Gymnasts at the 2003 Pan American Games
Gymnasts at the 2007 Pan American Games
Gymnasts at the 2011 Pan American Games
Pan American Games silver medalists for Puerto Rico
Pan American Games medalists in gymnastics
Central American and Caribbean Games gold medalists for Puerto Rico
Competitors at the 2010 Central American and Caribbean Games
Penn State Nittany Lions men's gymnasts
Central American and Caribbean Games medalists in gymnastics
Medalists at the 2011 Pan American Games
21st-century Puerto Rican people